Alexander Palmer (born 10 August 1996) is an English professional footballer who plays as a goalkeeper for West Bromwich Albion. He has also represented England at youth international level.

Club career
On 24 May 2015, Palmer made the bench for West Bromwich Albion for the first time, remaining as an unused substitute in a 4–1 loss to Arsenal. In June 2015, he joined National League side Kidderminster Harriers on a youth loan. Two years later, he joined Kidderminster on another loan deal. On 14 November 2018, he joined League Two side Oldham Athletic on a seven-day emergency loan. Three days later, he made his English Football League debut, playing the full match in a 3–1 win for Oldham over Cambridge United. On 12 April 2019, he went out on another seven-day emergency loan, this time to Notts County, making his only appearance a day later in the 3–0 loss to Crewe Alexandra.

On 16 July 2019, Palmer joined League Two side Plymouth Argyle on a season-long loan deal. Palmer kept a clean sheet on his debut and was widely considered to be man-of-the-match.

On 4 September 2020, it was announced that Palmer had joined Lincoln City on loan for the season, signing with team mate Callum Morton. A day later, he made his debut for Lincoln, starting the game in the EFL Cup.

On 25 August 2021, Palmer finally made his West Brom debut after 11 years since joining the club, starting in the 0–6 defeat against Arsenal in the EFL cup second round.

On 4 March 2022, Palmer joined EFL Championship side Luton Town on an emergency loan deal following injuries to goalkeepers Jed Steer and James Shea.

International career
Palmer has represented England at under-16 level on four occasions.

Career statistics

Honours 
Plymouth Argyle
League Two promotion: 2019–20

Individual
PFA Team of the Year: 2019–20 League Two

References

External links

1996 births
English footballers
Living people
Association football goalkeepers
England youth international footballers
West Bromwich Albion F.C. players
Kidderminster Harriers F.C. players
Oldham Athletic A.F.C. players
Notts County F.C. players
Plymouth Argyle F.C. players
Lincoln City F.C. players
Luton Town F.C. players
Sportspeople from Kidderminster
English Football League players
National League (English football) players